Gabrielle Tuleu (born 14 January 1988 in Chambray-lès-Tours, Indre-et-Loire) is a French sprint canoeist. Tuleu is a member of Canoe-Kayak Club Tours in Tours, and is coached and trained by Jean-Pascal Crochet.

Tuleu represented France at the 2012 Summer Olympics in London, where she competed in the  women's K-4 500 metres, along with her teammates Marie Delattre, Sarah Guyot, and Joanne Mayer. Tuleu and her team finished last in the final by more than a second behind the Russian team (led by Yuliana Salakhova), recording the slowest time of 1:35.299.

References

External links
NBC Olympics Profile

1988 births
French female canoeists
Living people
Olympic canoeists of France
Canoeists at the 2012 Summer Olympics
People from Chambray-lès-Tours
Sportspeople from Indre-et-Loire
Canoeists at the 2015 European Games
European Games competitors for France